The Éire Society of Boston was founded in 1937 to promote Irish culture and to bring it to a wider audience particularly in the United States of America.

Gold medal
Each year the Society bestows its Gold Medal award to individuals they feel have made "significant contributions to benefit society and to their chosen fields of expertise". Recipients in entertainment have included filmmakers John Ford and John Huston, Irish actresses Siobhán McKenna, Anna Manahan and Maureen O'Hara, Irish poet Seamus Heaney, and musicians The Chieftains and Tommy Makem. Politicians include: Mary Robinson, Thomas P. O'Neill, Charles Haughey, George J. Mitchell and U.S. Ambassadors to Ireland William V. Shannon and Jean Kennedy Smith, former Speaker of the U.S. House of Representatives John W. McCormack and President John F. Kennedy (in 1957). Academics, cultural and fine arts awardees include: Charles Donagh Maginnis, Desmond Guinness and Padraig O'Malley.

Sources

Notes

Clubs and societies in Massachusetts
Organizations based in Boston
1937 establishments in Massachusetts
Ethnic fraternal orders in the United States
Irish-American organizations
Irish-American culture in Boston